Babaoshan is an atonal pinyin romanization of various Chinese places.

It may refer to:

 Babao Mountains in Gansu, China
 Babaoshan Subdistrict in Shijingshan Subdistrict in Beijing, China
 Babaoshan Revolutionary Cemetery, in Beijing
 Babaoshan Station on the Beijing Subway's Line 1